The Basic Law of the Macao Special Administrative Region of the People's Republic of China is the constitutional document of Macau, replacing the Estatuto Orgânico de Macau. It was adopted on 31 March 1993 by China's National People's Congress and promulgated by President Jiang Zemin; it came into effect on 20 December 1999, following the transfer of sovereignty over Macau from Portugal to China.

In accordance with Article 31 of the Constitution of the People's Republic of China, Macau has special administrative region status, which provides constitutional guarantees for implementing the policy of "one country, two systems" and the constitutional basis for enacting the Basic Law of the Macau Special Administrative Region. The Macau Special Administrative Region is directly under the authority of the central government of China in Beijing, which controls the foreign policy and defense of Macau but otherwise grants the region a "high degree of autonomy."

See also
Basic law
Hong Kong Basic Law
Macau security law

External links 

 Government website about the basic law: in Chinese and in Portuguese
 Full text 
 Official texts in Macau's official languages: in Chinese and in Portuguese via the Government Printing Bureau's official website
 English translations: Government Printing Bureau's official website and University of Macau translation

Harald Brüning: 10 anos de Lei Básica. Revista Macau, Maio 2003, III Série No. 14. ISSN 0871-004X

 
Basic Law
Laws of China
Basic Law
Basic Law
Basic Law
1993 in law
Basic Law